Hope, Peace, and Liberty is a Colombian political party. The party was created in 1991, when the guerrillas Popular Liberation Army ( or EPL) demobilized.  The demobilized members formed a kept the initialism EPL in forming Hope Peace and Liberty.  The party was active mostly in Antioquia Department and Córdoba Department. However, some maverick remnants of the guerrilla still operate as so.

While most members of the Popular Liberation Army demobilized and joined Hope, Peace, and Liberty, some members refused to demobilize and formed the Popular Liberation Army - Dissident Line (Ejército Popular de Liberación - Línea Disidente).  This violent splinter group has killed Hope, Peace, and Liberty members, whom they consider traitors to the revolutionary cause.  The Revolutionary Armed Forces of Colombia—People's Army (FARC-EP) and the National Liberation Army (ELN) likewise consider Hope, Peace, and Liberty to be enemies of their revolutions; according to a report by Human Rights Watch, "the FARC and its urban militias were believed responsible for 204 murders of Esperanza members and amnestied EPL guerrillas from 1991 to 1995."

Notes

External links
Official webpage of Hope, Peace, and Liberty

1991 establishments in Colombia
Communist parties in Colombia
Defunct communist parties
Defunct political parties in Colombia
Political parties established in 1991
Political parties with year of disestablishment missing